Sergey Vladimirovich Karetnik (born 15 February 1995) is a Ukrainian-Russian football midfielder. He plays for Poltava.

Career
He is the product of the FC Dynamo Kyiv youth sportive system. Than he transferred to Russia and accepted the Russian citizenship. From January 2014 he played on loan for FC Metalurh Donetsk in the Ukrainian Premier League.

He made his Russian Premier League debut for FC Kuban Krasnodar against FC Ufa on 24 April 2015.

In 14 February 2019 became the member of Lithuanian FK Palanga.

International
Karetnyk played for the Ukraine-16 in several youth championships. He has not debuted for the senior team, so is still eligible for Ukraine or Russia

Personal life
His father Volodymyr Karetnyk played in the Ukrainian Premier League in the 1990s for FC Zorya-MALS Luhansk, MFC Kremin Kremenchuk, FC Prykarpattya Ivano-Frankivsk and FC Nyva Ternopil.

References

External links 

1995 births
People from Lubny
Living people
Ukrainian footballers
Ukraine youth international footballers
Russian footballers
Russian expatriate footballers
Association football midfielders
Ukrainian emigrants to Russia
Naturalised citizens of Russia
Ukrainian Premier League players
Russian Premier League players
A Lyga players
Armenian Premier League players
FC Metalurh Donetsk players
FC Kuban Krasnodar players
FC Anzhi Makhachkala players
FC Tom Tomsk players
FC Nizhny Novgorod (2015) players
FK Palanga players
FC Ararat Yerevan players
FC Yenisey Krasnoyarsk players
FC Dynamo Bryansk players
FC Shinnik Yaroslavl players
FC Khimik Dzerzhinsk players
Association football forwards
Russian expatriate sportspeople in Lithuania
Russian expatriate sportspeople in Armenia
Expatriate footballers in Lithuania
Expatriate footballers in Armenia
Sportspeople from Poltava Oblast